Actinocladum is a South American genus of bamboo in the grass family.

Species
The only known species is  Actinocladum verticillatum. The species is widespread across Bolivia and much of Brazil.

See also 
 List of Poaceae genera

References 

Bambusoideae genera
Bambusoideae
Grasses of South America
Grasses of Brazil
Flora of Bolivia
Monotypic Poaceae genera